Gymnastics events at the 2009 Games of the Small States of Europe were held in Cyprus.

Medalists

Artistic gymnastics

Men

Women

Rhythmic gymnastics

Women

References

2009 in gymnastics
Gymnastics at the Games of the Small States of Europe
International gymnastics competitions hosted by Cyprus